Augustina Stridsberg, formerly Augustina Jirku (1892–1978), was an American citizen, and the mother of Margietta Voge (née Jirku).  Both mother and daughter worked for Soviet intelligence between 1943 and 1944.  Stridsberg worked for the KGB San Francisco office. Her code name with Soviet intelligence, as deciphered by the Venona project, was "Klara".

Stridsberg was also a writer and an interpreter as well as a literary translator.

References

Further reading 
 Agrell, Wilhelm 

Austrian women writers
American translators
American people of Austrian descent
American spies for the Soviet Union
American people in the Venona papers
Espionage in the United States
20th-century translators
20th-century women writers
20th-century Austrian writers
1892 births
1978 deaths